A Boston is a cocktail made with  London dry gin, apricot brandy, grenadine, and the juice of a lemon.

See also

 List of cocktails

References

Cocktails with gin